Zosimus (490s–510s) was a Greek historian who lived in Constantinople during the reign of the eastern Roman Emperor Anastasius I (491–518). According to Photius, he was a comes, and held the office of "advocate" of the imperial treasury. Zosimus was also known for condemning Constantine’s rejection of the traditional polytheistic religion.

Historia Nova 
Zosimus' Historia Nova (Ἱστορία Νέα, "New History") is written in Greek in six books. For the period from 238 to 270, he apparently uses Dexippus; for the period from 270 to 404, Eunapius; and after 407, Olympiodorus. His dependence upon his sources is made clear by the change in tone and style between the Eunapian and Olympiodoran sections, and by the gap left in between them. In the Eunapian section, for example, he is pessimistic and critical of Stilicho; in the Olympiodoran section, he offers precise figures and transliterations from the Latin, and favors Stilicho.

The first book sketches briefly the history of the early Roman emperors from Augustus to Diocletian (305); the second, third and fourth deal more fully with the period from the accession of Constantius Chlorus and Galerius to the death of Theodosius I; the fifth and sixth cover the period between 395 and 410, when Priscus Attalus was deposed; for this period, he is the most important surviving non-ecclesiastical source. The work, which breaks off abruptly in the summer of 410 at the beginning of the sixth book, is believed to have been written in 498–518.

The style is characterized by Photius as concise, clear and pure. The historian's object was to account for the decline of the Roman Empire from the pagan point of view. Zosimus is the only non-Christian source for much of what he reports.

In contrast to Polybius, who had narrated the rise of the Roman Empire, Zosimus documented the events and causes which led to its decline. Though the decline of the Roman Empire was Zosimus' primary subject, he also discussed events connected with Persian and Greek history, perhaps in imitation of Polybius. It is clear that Photius and Evagrius did not have any more of Zosimus' work than what survives today. Yet it is likely that either a part of the work has been lost or, more likely, that Zosimus did not live to finish it; for it does not cover all the areas that Zosimus himself tells us he intended to discuss. There does not seem much probability in the conjecture that the monks and other ecclesiastics succeeded in suppressing that portion of the work in which the evil influences of their body were to be more especially touched upon. If the work was thus left incomplete, that circumstance would account for some carelessness of style which is here and there apparent. There may appear some difficulty at first sight, however, in the statement of Photius, that the work, in the form in which he saw it, appeared to him to be a second edition. But it would seem that Photius was under some misapprehension. It is called in the manuscripts Historia Nova (in what sense is not quite clear). This may perhaps have misled Photius. He himself remarks that he had not seen the first edition.

Zosimus was a pagan, and is by no means sparing of the faults and crimes of the Christian emperors. In consequence of this his credibility has been fiercely assailed by several Christian writers. The question does not, as has sometimes been supposed, turn upon the credibility of the historians whom Zosimus followed, for he did not adhere in all cases to their judgment with respect to events and characters. For instance, although Zosimus followed Eunapius for the period 270–404, he entirely differed from Eunapius in his account of Stilicho and Serena. Of post-medieval writers, Caesar Baronius, Lelio Bisciola, Kaspar von Barth, Johann Daniel Ritter, Richard Bentley, and G. E. M. de Ste. Croix, have taken the derogatory side. Bentley in particular speaks of Zosimus with great contempt. On the other hand, his historical authority has been maintained by Leunclavius, G. B. von Schirach, J. Matth. Schrockh, and Reitemeier.

Editions 
The history of Zosimus was first printed in the Latin translation of Leunclavius, accompanied by a defence of the historian (Basel, 1576, fol.). The first two books, in Greek, with the translation of Leunclavius, were printed by H. Stephanus, in his edition of Herodian (Paris, 1581). The first complete edition of the Greek text of Zosimus was that by F. Sylburg (Scriptores Hist. Rom. Min., vol. iii., Frankfurt, 1590). Later editions are those published at Oxford (1679), at Zeitz and Jena, edited by Cellarius, with annotations of his own and others (1679, 1713, 1729). The next edition is that by Reitemeier, who, though he consulted no fresh manuscripts, made good use of the critical remarks of Heyne and other scholars (Leipzig, 1784). Bekker produced a reliable edition in 1837 at Bonn. There is a German translation by Seybold and Heyler, and also an English and a French translation. (Schöll, Gesch. d. Griech. Lit. vol. iii, p. 232 ; Fabric. Bibl. Graec. vol. viii. p. 62.)

The single good manuscript, in the Vatican Library (MS Vat. Gr. 156), was unavailable to scholars until the mid-19th century, although it lacks the conclusion of the first book and the beginning of the second. Ludwig Mendelssohn (Leipzig 1887) edited the first dependable text. The modern standard edition is F. Paschoud Zosime: Histoire Nouvelle (Paris 1971) which has a French translation, introduction and commentary.  A later edition in English, Zosimus: New History a translation with commentary by Ronald T. Ridley,  was published in 1982 by the Australian Association of Byzantine Studies.

References

External links

Greek text with Latin translation on Google Books
Raw OCR Greek text of Mendelssohn's 1887 Teubner edition of the Historia Nova (from the Lace collection at Mount Allison University)
Greek text from the First One-Thousand Years of Greek Project
The manuscripts of the Historia Nova
Translation of the Historia Nova (published in 1814), book 1, book 2, book 3, book 4, book 5, book 6 

The Chinese translation of Zosimi Historia Nova
Jona Lendering (livius.org) on Zosimus

5th-century births
6th-century deaths
6th-century Byzantine historians
Comites
Late Antique writers
Late-Roman-era pagans
Critics of Christianity